Aldair Adulai Djaló Baldé (born 31 January 1992), known as Aldair, is a professional footballer who plays for Olimpija Ljubljana as a winger. Born in Portugal, he represents the Guinea-Bissau national team.

International career
Aldair was a youth international for Portugal before switching to Guinea Bissau for the 2017 Africa Cup of Nations. He made his debut in the opening 1–1 tie with Gabon on 14 January 2017.

Career statistics

International 

Scores and results list Guinea-Bissau's goal tally first, score column indicates score after each Aldair goal.

References

External links 
 
 Aldair at Footballdatabase

1992 births
Living people
People from Amarante, Portugal
Sportspeople from Porto District
Citizens of Guinea-Bissau through descent
Bissau-Guinean footballers
Guinea-Bissau international footballers
Portuguese footballers
Portugal youth international footballers
Portugal under-21 international footballers
Portuguese sportspeople of Bissau-Guinean descent
Association football wingers
Liga Portugal 2 players
Primeira Liga players
Cypriot First Division players
Campeonato de Portugal (league) players
Cypriot Second Division players
Slovenian PrvaLiga players
F.C. Penafiel players
S.C. Olhanense players
AEL Limassol players
Gil Vicente F.C. players
C.F. União players
Onisilos Sotira players
NK Tabor Sežana players
NK Olimpija Ljubljana (2005) players
2017 Africa Cup of Nations players
Bissau-Guinean expatriate footballers
Expatriate footballers in Cyprus
Expatriate footballers in Slovenia